Paria (The pariah) is an 1869 opera in three acts by Stanisław Moniuszko to a libretto by Jan Chęciński - the librettist of Straszny dwór - after the play Le paria (1821) by Casimir Delavigne.

Cast
Idamor, head of the warrior caste - tenor
Ratef, his trustee - tenor
Akebar, high priest - bass
Neala, his daughter - soprano
Mirra, priestess - mezzo-soprano
Dżares, the pariah, Idamor's father - baritone
brahmins, priestesses, warriors, people

Recordings
Paria  with Katarzyna Hołysz – Neala, Leszek Skrla – Dżares, Janusz Lewandowski – Akebar, Tomasz Kuk – Idamor, Andrzej Lampert – Ratef. Chór i Orkiestra Opery na Zamku w Szczecinie, cond. Warcisław Kunc 2CD, 2008, Dux 0686/7.
Paria (in Italian version), Katarzyna Hołysz (Neala), Robert Jezierski (Akebar), Yuri Gorodetski (Idamor), Szymon Komasa (Djares), Tomasz Warmijak (Ratef) Poznan Philharmonic Orchestra, Łukasz Borowicz 2CD 2019 Dux

References

Operas
1869 operas
Operas by Stanisław Moniuszko
Operas set in India